Mason County Historical Society, located in Ludington, Michigan, is a

Background 
Mason County Historical Society was formed November 30, 1937.

References

External links

Museums in Mason County, Michigan
Historical societies in Michigan